The 3rd Swiss Regiment Reding was a unit of Swiss soldiers in the Spanish Army and one of several Swiss regiments serving the Spanish Crown in the 18th century. The regiment was founded by a royal proclamation of Philip V in 1742 and recruited from the Canton of Schwyz in central Switzerland.

It was the third Swiss regiment in service at the time (out of about a dozen or so Swiss Regiments historically) and was the second raising of a regiment under Theodor von Reding. It is therefore either referred to as the 2nd Regiment Reding or the 3rd Swiss Regiment.

See also
Army of Spain (Peninsular War)

Notes

References

Gates, David. The Spanish Ulcer: A History of the Peninsular War. Da Capo Press 2001. 

Infantry regiments of Spain
Military units and formations of the Peninsular War
Military history of Spain
Spain–Switzerland military relations
Military units and formations established in 1742
Military units and formations disestablished in 1829